Lamberto Gama (born June 15, 1992) is an East Timorese football player. He is the current midfielder for the Timor-Leste national football team. His international debut against the Philippine team on October 20, 2010 in 2010 AFF Suzuki Cup qualification.

References

1992 births
Living people
East Timorese footballers
Association football midfielders
Timor-Leste international footballers
A.D. Dili Leste players